The Kanstadstraumen Bridge is a cantilever road bridge that crosses the Kanstadfjorden in Lødingen Municipality in Nordland county, Norway. The bridge connects the western part of the municipality to the rest of the municipality. The bridge is a box girder design made out of pre-stressed concrete and it was completed on 12 December 1976.

See also
List of bridges in Norway
List of bridges in Norway by length
List of bridges
List of bridges by length

References

Lødingen
Road bridges in Nordland
Roads within the Arctic Circle